Lala Valborg Sjöqvist (also Sjöquist, later Larsson, 23 September 1903 – 8 August 1964) was a Swedish diver who won the bronze medal in the 10 m platform event at the 1928 Olympics. Her younger sister Ingeborg was also an Olympic diver.

References

Further reading 
 

1903 births
1964 deaths
Swedish female divers
Divers at the 1928 Summer Olympics
Olympic divers of Sweden
Olympic medalists in diving
Medalists at the 1928 Summer Olympics
Olympic bronze medalists for Sweden
People from Nybro Municipality
Sportspeople from Kalmar County